The Airdrome Sopwith Pup is an American amateur-built aircraft, designed and produced by Airdrome Aeroplanes, of Holden, Missouri. The aircraft is supplied as a kit for amateur construction.

The aircraft is a full-scale replica of the First World War British Sopwith Pup fighter. The replica is built from modern materials and powered by modern engines.

Design and development
The Airdrome Sopwith Pup features a strut-braced biplane layout, a single-seat open cockpit, fixed conventional landing gear and a single engine in tractor configuration.

The aircraft fuselage is made from metal tubing, covered in doped aircraft fabric. The standard engine used is the  four stroke Rotec R2800 radial engine. Building time from the factory-supplied kit is estimated at 450 hours by the manufacturer.

Operational history
One example had been completed by December 2011. Another example completed its first flight in late May 2017.

Specifications (Sopwith Pup)

References

Homebuilt aircraft
Single-engined tractor aircraft